Stejneger's beaked whale (Mesoplodon stejnegeri), also known as the Bering Sea beaked whale or the saber-toothed whale, is a relatively unknown member of the genus Mesoplodon inhabiting the North Pacific Ocean. Leonhard Hess Stejneger collected the type specimen (a beach-worn skull) on Bering Island in 1883, from which Frederick W. True provided the species' description in 1885. In 1904, the first complete skull (from an adult male that had stranded near Newport, Oregon) was collected, which confirmed the species' validity. The most noteworthy characteristic of the males is the very large, saber-like teeth, hence the name.

Description
The body for this species is typical for a mesoplodont, long and tapering at both ends. The beak is of medium length, and the mouthline forms an arch, though much smoother than other species. The teeth of the males are much larger than those of most other mesoplodonts and point forwards and inwards right in front of the apex. Only strap-toothed whales and spade-toothed whales have longer teeth. The coloration is overall dark gray to black on the body with light coloration below, and around the head giving it a "helmeted" appearance. The coloration darkens with age, but females have a light pattern on the bottom of the flukes that becomes more apparent with age. Like most species, scars occur on the males (from other males) and cookiecutter shark bites are present on both sexes. The length is at least 5.25 meters (17 feet 6 inches) for males and 5.5 meters (18 feet) for females. They are likely around 2.1 to 2.3 meters (7 to 8 feet) in length when born.

Population and distribution
This is the northernmost species of beaked whale in the Pacific Ocean, ranging up into the Bering Sea. They are distributed along both sides of the Pacific to Miyagi Prefecture, Japan and southern California. They may migrate south in winter.

Behavior
The whales are typically found in groups of three to four and sometimes up to 15 animals in a very close group. The groups may have age and sex segregation. Adult males fight each other extensively, and some specimens have been found with healed jaw fractures.

Conservation
This species has been occasionally hunted in Japan in the past, and occasionally been caught in drift nets. It is uncertain how much this affects the population.

See also

List of cetaceans

References

Sources
Encyclopedia of Marine Mammals. William F. Perrin, Bernd Wursig, and J.G.M Thewissen, editors. Academic Press, 2002. 
Sea Mammals of the World. Randall R. Reeves, Brent S. Steward, Phillip J. Clapham, and James A. Owell. A & C Black, London, 2002.

External links
Cetaceans of the World
CMS
Whale & Dolphin Conservation Society (WDCS)
Rare Stejneger’s Beaked Whale Beaches at Venice Beach, California

Mesoplodont whales
Mammals described in 1885
Taxa named by Leonhard Stejneger